Taastrup station is a Copenhagen S-train railway station serving the railway town/suburb of Taastrup west of Copenhagen, Denmark. It is located on the Taastrup radial of Copenhagen's S-train network.

History
 
Taastrup station was one of the original stations on Denmark's first railway between Copenhagen and Roskilde. It was inaugurated on 26 June 1847. The station was later converted into an S-train station. The old station building was demolished in 1979.

Service
Taastrup Station is served by B trains.

In popular culture
The old Taastrup station is used as a location in the 1951 film Lyntoget.

References

External links

S-train (Copenhagen) stations
Buildings and structures in Høje-Taastrup Municipality
Railway stations opened in 1847
Railway stations in Denmark opened in the 19th century